Caladrius Biosciences is an American biopharmaceutical company active in the field of stem cell therapy and regenerative medicine, particularly (in 2012) of cardiovascular disease.

Founded in 1980, the company was formerly known as Corniche Group Inc, Phase III Medical Inc, and NeoStem, Inc., it adopted its current name in 2015.

Cardiovascular disease
In 2012 it started a phase 2 clinical trial of AMR-001 (NBS10), an autologous bone marrow-derived cell therapy enriched for CD34+ cells, for acute myocardial infarction. Initial results included a statistically significant mortality benefit.

References

Companies listed on the Nasdaq
Biotechnology companies of the United States
Companies based in New York City